Side 3 may refer to:

 Side 3 (Raspberries album), 1973
 Side 3 (Circulatory System album), 2010